Richard Warner Carlson (born Richard Boynton; February 10, 1941) is an American journalist, diplomat and lobbyist who was the director of the Voice of America during the last six years of the Cold War. At the same time, he led Radio Marti broadcasting to Cuba, and was director of the U.S. Information Agency and the USIA Documentary Film Service. Carlson has also been a newspaper and wire service reporter, a magazine writer, a TV and radio correspondent and a documentary filmmaker. He is the father of conservative television host Tucker Carlson.

Early life and education
Carlson was born the son of college student Richard Boynton and Dorothy Anderson, 18 and 15 years old, respectively. He was born with rickets and mildly bent legs, as Anderson had starved herself to keep the pregnancy a secret. In 1943, Richard Boynton attempted to persuade Dorothy to accompany him in stealing their baby and get married; when she refused on the grounds that she was a junior in high school and nobody but her parents knew about the baby, he shot and killed himself two blocks from her house.

Six weeks after he was born, Carlson was given to The Home for Little Wanderers, an orphanage in Boston. The home ran a classified ad about him in the local papers, under the headline: "Home Wanted for Foundling." Florence Moberger, a housewife in Malden, was the only person to respond.

Florence Moberger and her husband Carl had three children but were unable to have more. Carl and Florence agreed to foster Carlson until a family wanted to adopt him. Carlson lived with the Mobergers for over two years and stated that he developed a deep bond with the family. During that time, Carlson claimed many prospective parents came to visit him, including his birth mother, Anderson, posing as her own sister.

In 1943, Carlson was adopted by a wool broker and his wife, the Carlson family. Carlson's adoptive father died when he was twelve.

Carlson graduated from the Naval Academy Preparatory School and attended the University of Mississippi through an ROTC program, holding odd jobs in between the breaks. He was discharged in 1962 and did not graduate. He then moved to Los Angeles.

Career

Independent journalism
When Carlson was 22, he got a job working as a "copy boy" for night city editor Glenn Binford at the Los Angeles Times. There he met and befriended Carl Lance Brisson, the son of actress Rosalind Russell.

In 1963, Carlson became a reporter for United Press International. On his two days off, he wrote for Hearst movie columnist Louella Parsons in her Beverly Hills office. He also wrote for UPI's Foreign Film Bureau, contributing fan magazine stories and working under the editorship of Henry Gris, the first president of the Hollywood Foreign Press Association.

Two years later, Carlson and Brisson went to San Francisco to try to establish themselves, working as freelance independent television reporters, producing news features to sell for local and national distribution. They made less than $100 per week, until they were hired full-time by KGO-TV in San Francisco.

Carlson and Brisson became best known for a September 1969 article in Look, in which they linked Mayor Joseph Alioto to organized crime. Alioto later filed a $12 million libel lawsuit against the magazine. After three inconclusive jury trials, a fourth trial by judge without a jury in 1977 found that the plaintiff had sustained the burden of proving by clear and convincing evidence that defendant published the defamatory statements contained in the article with actual malice, that is, with reckless disregard for whether they were true or not, and was entitled to judgment in the sum of $350,000, plus costs. and the legal costs helped bring about the demise of Look. Legal technicalities prevented Carlson and Brisson from being held as defendants in the trial. Carlson stood by the story, claiming several of their sources refused to testify or died.

Investigative journalism

In 1971, Carlson was hired by KABC-TV in Los Angeles. Working with producer Pete Noyes, Carlson won several awards, including a Peabody Award for an exposé they produced about car promotion fraud.

In 1975, Noyes took a job at KFMB-TV in San Diego, and asked Carlson to join him as a combination news anchorman and investigative reporter. However, Carlson walked away from the job after 18 months, tiring of news, calling it a "kid's game" that was "insipid, sophomoric and superficial" and laced with "a lot of arrogance and hypocrisy." He admitted to being part of that hypocrisy, by citing a piece he did that outed a local tennis player, Dr. Renée Richards, as a transsexual woman.

Carlson also targeted G. Elizabeth Carmichael and outed her as transgender, refusing to refer to her as a woman when instructed to by the judge presiding over the trial. This story was popularized in the HBO miniseries, The Lady and the Dale.

Banker
In 1977, Carlson joined San Diego Federal Savings and Loan (later Great American First Savings), a savings and loan headed by Gordon Luce, a former cabinet member and close friend of Ronald Reagan, as its public affairs director. Within three years, he became vice president of finance.

Great American First Savings was mired in controversy due to the bank's political connections. For example, in 1984, the bank received negative press for allowing Edwin Meese, adviser to Ronald Reagan, to be 15 months delinquent on his mortgage. That same year, bank officers were accused of receiving federal jobs in exchange for being favorable toward Meese. Luce stated that he saw the loans to Meese as the "natural evolution" of mixing business, politics and friendship.

In 1981, the investigative television magazine 60 Minutes had Mike Wallace interview Carlson about controversial home foreclosures executed by the bank, in which the bank had been accused of duping low-income Californians. Carlson hired a camera crew to videotape the interview and, when the 60 Minutes cameras were not rolling during a commercial break, caught Wallace making a racist joke about blacks and Hispanics:

Wallace was forced to apologize, and Carlson left Great American in early 1983 to go into politics.

1984 mayoral campaign
In 1983, Carlson sought an appointment to the San Diego County Board of Supervisors.

The following year, Carlson decided to run for mayor of San Diego in what became a contentious campaign against incumbent Roger Hedgecock, who was under indictment for perjury and conspiracy.

Carlson was criticized for numerous infractions throughout his campaign. For example, he was criticized for speaking of his candidacy in terms of political strategy, without mentioning a vision or plans for the city. He was criticized for being "long on generalities and platitudes, but short on specifics." He was criticized as naïve for saying that the city wasn't run by the mayor, but by the city manager. He was further criticized for pledging not to spend his own money on the campaign, but going on to spend nearly $225,000 of his own money, and by "gay-baiting" –– falsely claiming that Hedgecock was supported by the gay community in an effort to turn voters away from Hedgecock. Carlson also had a comic, at one of his major fundraisers, tell a series of racist jokes for which Carlson later apologized.

Carlson's campaign came under scrutiny for its close ties to Great American First Savings, which had direct ties to the White House. Thirty employees donated over $4,000, each, to his campaign, while only one employee donated to Hedgecock. When pressed on the connection, and on other campaign issues, Carlson began to skip candidate forums, and members of the press deemed it increasingly difficult to get ahold of him, with Carlson often not responding to the press for periods of two weeks at a time. Carlson also lacked more exposure because Hedgecock, calling Carlson "a minor candidate," refused to debate him.

After spending $1.2 million on the campaign, and outspending Hedgecock by a 2:1 margin, Carlson lost the election.

Voice of America
In the summer of 1986, President Reagan announced his intention to nominate Carlson as an associate director of the United States Information Agency to succeed Ernest Eugene Pell.

Carlson became director of Voice of America, a U.S. government-funded, state-owned multimedia agency which serves as the United States federal government's official institution for non-military, external broadcasting. It broadcasts 24 hours a day in nearly 50 languages to more than 130 million people around the world, with a full-time staff of 3,000 and a part-time staff of 1,200. Carlson was the longest-serving director in VOA's 50-year history.

Ambassador to Seychelles 
In June 1991, Carlson left Voice of America after President George H. W. Bush nominated him to be the U.S. ambassador to the Seychelles.

CEO
In March 1992, Carlson became the CEO of the Corporation for Public Broadcasting (CPB), a "private corporation funded by the American people" that produces and distributes programming for public broadcasting.

During his tenure, the Republican Party began its official shift on public broadcasting when it added a plank to its platform condemning public media as "misguided," "ridiculous," and undeserving of government support. The party's official position was that public media had a liberal bias and "the party looked forward to" the privatization of the system.

Critics decried that Republicans were weaponizing public broadcasting in order to make it an election issue against candidates who supported it. Carlson says he was against the platform change:

Carlson remained at CPB for five years.

King World Public
In 1997, he became president and CEO of King World Public Television, a subsidiary of King World Productions, the syndicator of Oprah, Wheel of Fortune and Jeopardy!, among other successful TV shows, until the network was purchased, in the summer of 1999, by CBS for $2.5 billion.

Foreign relations
Carlson has testified dozens of times before various U.S. Congressional committees, including the Senate Foreign Relations Committee and the House Foreign Relations Committee. He has also been involved in negotiations on behalf of the U.S. government with many foreign governments, including those of China, Korea, the USSR, Germany, Costa Rica, Belize, Liberia, Botswana, Lesotho, South Africa, Morocco and Israel.

In 1990, Carlson jointly addressed the Israeli Knesset with Malcolm Forbes, Jr. Three years later, he jointly addressed Britain's House of Commons with Richard Branson.

In 1994, Carlson was an international observer at the first democratic elections in South Africa.

In 1997, he was an international observer at the Parliamentary Elections in Albania, overseeing polling places near the Greek border.

In 2003, Carlson became the vice-chairman of the Foundation for Defense of Democracies, the counter-terrorism institute in Washington, D.C. and Brussels, Belgium. He held the position for eight years.

From 1992 to 1997, he was also president of InterMedia, the global research consulting firm which conducts opinion surveys for government agencies in over 75 foreign countries. He is currently its Chairman.

Carlson was an advisor of the Institute for the Study of Terrorism & Political Violence. He is also a long-time member of the European Broadcasting Union and the Asian Broadcasting Union.

In 2021, Carlson was reported to be a director of Policy Impact, a lobbying firm. The firm has lobbied the United States on behalf of the Viktor Orban regime in Hungary.

Author
Carlson co-wrote Snatching Hillary, A Satirical Novel (Tulip Hill Publishing, 2014) with Bill Cowan.

He is the author of books: Women in San Diego's History (1977), Free and Fair: The Last Two Weeks of Apartheid (1995), and Why Dogs Talk on Christmas Eve. (2014).

He writes a weekly newspaper column, often about terrorism and national security, for the Pittsburgh Tribune-Review and the Charleston Mercury. He is a former political gossip columnist writing "The Shadow Knows" for The Hill newspaper in Washington, D.C. with Bill Regardie.

Personal life
In 1967, Carlson married artist Lisa McNear (née Lombardi). They had two sons, Tucker McNear Carlson (later, Tucker Swanson McNear Carlson), born in 1969, and Buckley Peck Carlson (later, Buckley Swanson Peck Carlson). Carlson and Lombardi divorced in 1976. Carlson was granted custody of Tucker and Buckley. Tucker Carlson would later say that his mother left the family when he was six, wanting to pursue a "bohemian" lifestyle.

In 1979, Carlson married divorcée Patricia Caroline Swanson, an heiress to the Swanson frozen-food fortune. Swanson is the daughter of Gilbert Carl Swanson, and the niece of Senator J. William Fulbright. This was the third marriage for Swanson, who legally adopted Tucker Carlson and his brother.

Carlson was said to be an active father who had a specific outlook in raising his sons:

In 1984, Carlson was in business with Karon Luce, wife of savings and loan executive Gordon Luce, manufacturing modular cabinets.

Carlson has an honorary doctor of law degree from the California Western School of Law in San Diego.

Carlson and his wife live in Chevy Chase, Maryland, and in a small Virginia town on the Chesapeake Bay. They have a summer home on an island in Maine.

References

External links
 

1941 births
Ambassadors of the United States to Seychelles
American chief executives in the media industry
American male journalists
Living people
Military personnel from Massachusetts
United States Navy sailors
Voice of America people
Writers from Boston
20th-century American diplomats
American adoptees